Kansas Bowling (born August 2, 1996) is an American film director, screenwriter, cinematographer, and actress. She is best known for directing B.C. Butcher (2016) and acting in Once Upon a Time in Hollywood (2019).

Early life 
Bowling was born and raised in Hollywood, California. At age 13, she received a Super 8 film camera as a Christmas gift and immediately started shooting short films with her sister.

Career

B.C. Butcher 
Bowling directed B.C. Butcher (2016) starring Kato Kaelin, Rodney Bingenheimer, Natasha Halevi, and Kadeem Hardison. The film was produced by Lloyd Kaufman and distributed by Troma Entertainment on their streaming service Troma Now on VHX.

The movie had its theatrical premiere on March 3, 2016, at Grauman's Egyptian Theatre in Hollywood, California. The premiere had a musical performance by Count Smokula and Ron Jeremy.

Bowling was the first inductee into the Troma Institute For Gifted Youth and listed as one of W Magazine's 42 up-and-comers in their April 2016 "Next in Line" issue.

Bowling has stated that B.C. Butcher is inspired by The Texas Chain Saw Massacre, Switchblade Sisters, Raquel Welch, Doris Wishman, and Joey Ramone. Critics have described B.C. Butcher as a "feminist slasher movie".

Music videos 

Bowling has directed over 25 music videos for various artists (shot on 8mm or 16mm film).

In the music video for Kat Meoz's "Here I Wait", Bowling shot the only existing footage of Richard Brautigan's papier-mâché bird Willard who was the subject of his 1975 novel Willard and His Bowling Trophies.

On April 13, 2018, German band Drangsal released a controversial video for their song "Magst Du Mich" directed by and starring Bowling and her sister Parker Love Bowling referencing pizzagate conspiracy theories and acting as "Hillary Clinton's sex slaves".

On August 15, 2018, Rolling Stone released a video Bowling directed for the Death Valley Girls' song "Disaster (Is What We're After)". The video is four minutes of musician Iggy Pop eating a hamburger. The video is an homage to Jørgen Leth's 1982 film 66 Scenes of America, where Andy Warhol eats a hamburger. Yahoo Entertainment named it one of their favorite videos of the year.

On October 2, 2018, Stereogum premiered another video Bowling directed for the Death Valley Girls for their song "One Less Thing (Before I Die)". Bowling attended the home-made rocket launch for the daredevil and limo driver Mad Mike Hughes and filmed his successful attempt at launching in the sky. Included in the video is footage from Noize TV of Mad Mike Hughes kissing Bowling after being put on a stretcher and loaded into an ambulance.

Galore Magazine premiered a video October 26, 2018, Bowling directed for the band Collapsing Scenery's song "Resort Beyond the Last Resort". The video is based on Boyd Rice's 1994 pro-rape manifesto "Revolt Against Penis Envy" which appeared in the controversial Answer Me! magazine. The video reverses the narrative of the essay and has Rice getting raped by a woman.

Acting 

Bowling and her sister Parker Love Bowling starred in Jared Master's biblical period film Absolute Vow alongside Aki Aleong. The film was deemed controversial for mixing exploitive themes with religion.

June 22, 2017, Bowling appeared on season 2; episode 3 of the Viceland show Party Legends directed by Lance Bangs. Kansas' segment, "Swat Team Believer", is about a time she went to a concert by The Monkees and after meeting Michael Nesmith accidentally gets caught in a SWAT shoot-out. The episode is titled "Breaking Bad Vibes" and also features Theophilus London, Derek Waters, Nikki Glaser, and Duncan Trussell.

In 2018, Bowling produced and acted in the short film Swamp Women Kissing Booth which went on to be nominated in both the Austin Spotlight Film Festival and the Los Angeles CineFest. Swamp Women Kissing Booth was the first film to feature actress Kathleen Hughes, star of It Came from Outer Space, in a starring role since 1958.

In 2019, she portrayed Sandra Good, a member of the Manson family, in Quentin Tarantino's Once Upon a Time in Hollywood and appeared in Glenn Danzig's Verotika as well.

In early 2020, The Killers released a music video for their first single "Caution" off their new album Imploding the Mirage starring Bowling and Griffin Dunne.

In 2020, Bowling starred as the protagonist, Nancy Banana alongside Bill Weeden in the parody film, Psycho Ape!.

Personal life 
She is the older sister of actress Parker Love Bowling.

Filmography 
Film

Television

Music videos

References

External links 

Living people
1996 births
People from Hollywood, Los Angeles
American women screenwriters
American women film directors
Horror film directors
Film directors from Los Angeles
Screenwriters from California
21st-century American women